Torrington Municipal Airport  is two miles east of Torrington, in Goshen County, Wyoming. The National Plan of Integrated Airport Systems for 2011–2015 categorized it as a general aviation facility.

Facilities
The airport covers 256 acres (104 ha) at an elevation of 4,207 feet (1,282 m). It has two asphalt runways: 10/28 is 5,703 by 75 feet (1,738 x 23 m) and 2/20 is 3,001 by 60 feet (915 x 18 m).

In the year ending May 31, 2017 the airport had 4,225 aircraft operations, average 352 per month: 97% general aviation, 2% air taxi, and <1% military. 31 aircraft were then based at this airport: 90% single-engine, 6% multi-engine and 1% helicopter.

References

External links 
 Torrington Municipal Airport at City of Torrington website
 Aerial image as of June 1994 from USGS The National Map
 
 

Airports in Wyoming
Transportation in Goshen County, Wyoming
Buildings and structures in Goshen County, Wyoming
Torrington, Wyoming